Retinal cone dystrophy 3B is a very rare genetic disorder which is characterized by ocular anomalies. Approximately 34 cases from 20 families across the world have been described in medical literature (OMIM). This disorder is associated with autosomal recessive mutations in the KCNV2 and PDE6H genes.

Presentation 

People with the disorder often start showing symptoms when they are in their mid-late childhood-early adulthood, these symptoms are usually the following:

 Central scotoma
 Decreased visual acuity
 Photophobia
 Severe dyschromatopsia

Additional features include nystagmus.

Etimology 

This disorder was discovered by Michaelides et al., when they described 10 patients from 7 families across the world, these patients had retinal cone dystrophy, abnormally high rod responses, poor central vision, photophobia, mild nystagmus (in three patients), variable degrees of nearsightedness and astigmatism, progressive loss of visual acuity and color vision, reduced color discrimination, and other ocular symptoms, these families came from the United Kingdom, Somalia, Pakistan, Iran, and the United Arab Emirates.

References 

Genetic diseases and disorders
Autosomal recessive disorders